A Nod's as Good as a Wink... To a Blind Horse is the third album by British rock group Faces, and their second album of 1971. Bolstered somewhat by lead singer Rod Stewart's recent solo success with "Maggie May", it was their most successful album worldwide, peaking at No. 6 in the US, and reaching No. 2 in the UK. It also contains their biggest US hit, the swaggering "Stay with Me" (No. 6 in the UK, No. 17 in the US), and the album itself would be certified gold by the RIAA in 1972.

The album features two original ballads and a cover of Chuck Berry's "Memphis Tennessee". Bassist Ronnie Lane, usually confined to backing vocals and the occasional sole lead vocal on previous Faces records, sings lead on three of his own compositions here (one co-written with keyboardist Ian McLagan). Of these, "Debris", an elliptical examination of father-son relationships, was chosen as the B-side to their hit "Stay With Me".

The original issue of the album came with a large poster consisting of a picture collage, including images of pills and pharmaceutical capsules, as well as polaroid photos apparently taken on tour of band and crew members reveling with naked groupies in hotel rooms. Within weeks of release, the record company had second thoughts about the poster and re-issued the album without it, turning original copies with the poster into collectors' items overnight.

On 28 August 2015, the album was reissued in a remastered and expanded form, with the bonus tracks being two songs from a previously unreleased BBC session. The new vinyl reissue even replicated the poster included with the first-pressing vinyl release.

Reception
The album was included in the book 1001 Albums You Must Hear Before You Die.

Track listing
All tracks written by Rod Stewart and Ronnie Wood unless noted.

2015 Reissue bonus tracks
"Miss Judy's Farm" [BBC Session] (Stewart, Wood)
"Stay With Me" [BBC Session] (Stewart, Wood)

Charts

Personnel
Track numbering refers to CD and digital releases of the album.
Rod Stewart – lead vocals on tracks 1, 3, 5 & 7–9, harmonica
Ronnie Lane – bass, acoustic guitar, percussion, lead vocals on tracks 2, 4 & 6, backing vocals on "Too Bad"
Ronnie Wood – lead, slide, acoustic and pedal steel guitars, harmonica, backing vocals on "Too Bad"
Ian McLagan – piano, organ, backing vocals on "Too Bad"
Kenney Jones – drums, percussion
Harry Fowler – steel drums on "That's All You Need"
Glyn Johns – co-producer, engineer

Reissues

References 

1971 albums
Faces (band) albums
Warner Records albums
Albums produced by Glyn Johns
Albums recorded at Olympic Sound Studios
Albums produced by Rod Stewart
Albums produced by Ronnie Lane
Albums produced by Ronnie Wood
Albums produced by Kenney Jones
Albums produced by Ian McLagan